The 1947 Mount Albert by-election was a by-election held during the 28th New Zealand Parliament in the Auckland electorate of . The by-election occurred following the death of MP Arthur Richards and was won by Warren Freer.

Background
This triggered the Mount Albert by-election, which occurred on 24 September 1947. Warren Freer was the candidate for the Labour Party, and Jack Garland was the candidate for the National Party.

Candidates
Labour
There were nine nominees for the Labour Party candidacy who included:

The decision was deferred to the Labour Party's national executive. Freer was only 26 and relatively unknown to executive members, but local member Dick Barter convinced party leader Peter Fraser that his candidacy in Eden was adequate apprenticeship. He was eventually selected. Richards had urged Freer to stand for the safe Labour seat of Mt Albert when he died.

National
The National Party had five nominations which were:

Alfred Thomas Dow, secretary of the Auckland Provincial School Committees' Association and a former member of the Mount Eden Borough Council.
Peter Collingwood Fisher, of Hamilton, a wounded RNZAF officer, who served in Britain.
Jack Garland, a former member of the Auckland City Council and a candidate for the council at the next municipal elections.
Joan Rattray, a member of the Auckland City Council and the Metropolitan Youth Council.

Garland was chosen after winning a ballot of local members.

Campaign
Freer recalled two inspiring campaign speeches delivered by Martyn Finlay and Mabel Howard which were received well by voters.

Previous election

Results
The following table gives the election results:

Freer obtained 56% of the votes and was successful. Freer was staggered when his majority was close to that of Richards in 1946, rather than being well below (as for most by-elections). At the November local-body elections Garland was elected a member of the Auckland City Council.

See also
List of New Zealand by-elections
2009 Mount Albert by-election
2017 Mount Albert by-election

Notes

References 

Politics of the Auckland Region
1947 elections in New Zealand
By-elections in New Zealand
1940s in Auckland
September 1947 events in New Zealand